Yuncheng (运城市) is a prefecture-level city in Shanxi, People's Republic of China (PRC).

Yuncheng may also refer to:

Yuncheng County (郓城县), Shandong, PRC
Yuncheng Town (郓城镇), town in and seat of said county
Yuncheng District (云城区), Yunfu, Guangdong, PRC